

Brampton

Caledon

Mississauga

Caledon, Ontario
Buildings and structures in Mississauga
Buildings and structures in Brampton